A windbreak (shelterbelt) is a planting usually made up of one or more rows of trees or shrubs planted in such a manner as to provide shelter from the wind and to protect soil from erosion. They are commonly planted in hedgerows around the edges of fields on farms. If designed properly, windbreaks around a home can reduce the cost of heating and cooling and save energy. Windbreaks are also planted to help keep snow from drifting onto roadways or yards. Farmers sometimes use windbreaks to keep snow drifts on farm land that will provide water when the snow melts in the spring. Other benefits include contributing to a microclimate around crops (with slightly less drying and chilling at night), providing habitat for wildlife, and, in some regions, providing wood if the trees are harvested.

Windbreaks and intercropping can be combined in a farming practice referred to as alleycropping, or being deployed along riparian buffer stripes. Fields are planted in rows of different crops surrounded by rows of trees. These trees provide fruit, wood, or protect the crops from the wind. Alley cropping has been particularly successful in India, Africa, and Brazil, where coffee growers have combined farming and forestry.

A further use for a shelterbelt is to screen a farm from a main road or motorway. This improves the farm landscape by reducing the visual incursion of the motorway, mitigating noise from the traffic and providing a safe barrier between farm animals and the road.

Fences called "windbreaks" are also used. Normally made from cotton, nylon, canvas, and recycled sails, windbreaks tend to have three or more panels held in place with poles that slide into pockets sewn into the panel.  The poles are then hammered into the ground and a windbreak is formed. Windbreaks or "wind fences" are used to reduce wind speeds over erodible areas such as open fields, industrial stockpiles, and dusty industrial operations. As erosion is proportional to wind speed cubed, a reduction of wind speed of 1/2 (for example) will reduce erosion by 87.5%.

Sheltered, windless areas created by windbreaks are called wind shadows.

Windbreak aerodynamics 

In essence, when the wind encounters a porous obstacle such as a windbreak or shelterbelt, air pressure increases (loosely speaking, air piles up) on the windward side and (conversely) air pressure decreases on the leeward side. As a result, the airstream approaching the barrier is retarded, and a proportion of it is displaced up and over the barrier, resulting in a jet of higher wind speed aloft. The remainder of the impinging airstream, having been retarded in its approach, now circulates through the barrier to its downstream edge, pushed along by the decrease in pressure across the shelterbelt's width; emerging on the downwind side, that airstream is now further retarded by an adverse pressure gradient, because in the lee of the barrier, with increasing downwind distance air pressure recovers again to the ambient level. The result is that minimum wind speed occurs not at or within the windbreak, nor at its downwind edge, but further downwind - nominally, at a distance of about 3 to 5 times the windbreak height H. Beyond that point wind speed recovers, aided by downward momentum transport from the overlying, faster-moving stream. From the perspective of the Reynolds-averaged Navier–Stokes equations these effects can be understood as resulting from the loss of momentum caused by the drag of leaves and branches and would be represented by the body force fi (a distributed momentum sink).

Not only is the mean (average) wind speed reduced in the lee of the shelter, the wind is also less gusty, for turbulent wind fluctuations are also damped. As a result, turbulent vertical mixing is weaker in the lee of the barrier than it is upwind, and interesting secondary microclimatic effects result. For instance, by day sensible heat rising from the ground due to the absorption of sunlight (see surface energy budget) is mixed upward less efficiently in the lee of a windbreak, with the result that air temperature near ground is somewhat higher in the lee than on the windward side. Of course this effect is attenuated with increasing downwind distance and indeed, beyond about 8H downstream a zone may exist that is actually cooler than upwind.

See also

 Agroforestry
 Buffer strip
 Dead hedge
 Desertification
 Energy-efficient landscaping
 Erosion control
 Great Plains Shelterbelt
 Hedgerow
 Macro-engineering
 Rain shadow
 Sahara Forest Project
 Sand fence
 Seawater Greenhouse
 Tugay

References

 Wilson, 1985; Journal of Wind Engineering & Industrial Aerodynamics, Vol. 21
 Argete & Wilson, 1989, Agricultural & Forest Meteorology, Vol 48

Bibliography

External links

National Agroforestry Center (USDA)

Forestry and the environment
Landscape ecology
Agroforestry
Agriculture